The trident loop is a fixed loop knot which can jam when heavily loaded. It was proposed as a replacement for the figure-of-eight loop for use in climbing by Robert M. Wolfe, MD, who developed it as a loop form of Ashley's bend.  While some tests indicate its strength lies somewhere between the weaker Bowline and stronger figure-of-eight loop, the trident loop shows exceptional resistance to slipping in shock-loading tests.

Tying

See also
List of knots

References

Climbing knots